The 1992 United States Olympic trials for swimming events were held from March 1 to 7 in Indianapolis, Indiana.  It was the qualifying meet for American swimmers who hoped to compete at the 1992 Summer Olympics in Barcelona.

Results 
Key:

Men's events

Women's events

See also
United States at the 1992 Summer Olympics
United States Olympic Trials (swimming)
USA Swimming

External links
  1992 US Olympic swimming trials report at Usaswimming.org (provided by Swimming World Magazine)

United States Olympic trials
United States Summer Olympics Trials
Swimming Olympic trials